Solomon R. (Romanovich or Reuvenovich) Grobshtein was born in Baku, Azerbaijan. He became a prominent Soviet scientist, and one of the founders and organizers of the Azeri oil industry.

Solomon was head of the engineering control board in Azerbaijan, authored scientific books and was credited with several inventions, including the Flow Control Valve for Oil and Gas Wells (United States Patent US3332438, published on July 25, 1967) invented by him and his team, which included Abdullaev Asker Alekper Ogly, Alizade Fuad Agasamedovich, Aslanov Mukhtar Makhmud Ogly, Vodovzov Genrikh Zalmanovich, and Ragimova Elmira Mamed Kyzy, at the Nauchno-Issledovatelsky i Proektny Institute.
 
In 1951, he, and the team led by A. K. Aliyev, were awarded the State Premium for achievements in exploration, drilling, production, exploitation, construction of offshore oil wells.

From 1950-54, Solomon Romanovich Grobshtein was elected to the Supreme Soviet of Azerbaijan SSR.

Solomon was the brother of Borys Grobshtein (Dov Gazit).

References 
 Neft Dashlary 
 NEFTEKHIMAVTOMAT Seminars on Applications of radioisotope devices and methods in the industry of Azerbaidjan
 Flow control valve for oil and gas wells 

Azerbaijani engineers
Azerbaijani politicians
Soviet politicians
Azerbaijani Jews
Azerbaijan Communist Party (1920) politicians
Possibly living people
Year of birth missing